Ammar Ali Jan (Urdu: عمار علی جان, born December 15, 1986) is a Pakistani historian, activist, youth leader and academic. He is a self proclaimed Marxist, founder and president of Haqooq-e-Khalq Party, also a member of Progressive International.

Early life and education
Jan completed his school from Salamat International Campus for Advanced Studies in 2005, masters in social sciences from University of Chicago in 2011 and got his doctorate (Thesis title: "A study of Communist Thought in Colonial India, 1919-1951") in history from University of Cambridge in 2018.

Career
Jan has taught as assistant professor of history in University of the Punjab.,
Government College University, Lahore and Forman Christian College, Lahore.

Political struggle
The first political party Jan joined was Labour Party Pakistan (LPP). He was also part of Progressive Youth Front (PYF). In 2010, Jan, as general secretary Labour Party Pakistan, Lahore, got arrested for leading a demonstration against the power cuts and demanding a new transformer on urgent basis for provision of electricity to whole area. As member of PYF and LPP, Jan helped to form Labour Relief Campaign against foreign debt and to help flood affectees.
Jan is strong believer of revolutionary politics for which he had to face state oppression many times. Jan was fired from University of the Punjab in April, 2018 for his progressive political views and actions on the campus. In 2018, Jan was barred from speaking at 4th Faiz International Festival along with three other speakers including Taimur Rahman (LUMS professor), Ali Wazir (MNA) and Rashed Rahman (former Daily Times editor). In Feb, 2019 FIR against Jan was registered for participating in a protest against the killing of teacher and poet Arman Loni.
As an activist, Jan has been raising voice on fascism, students unions, anti-war policies, budget cuts in the health and education, political prisoners economy, free vaccine for all etc. 

In March, 2018 he helped in formation of Lahore Left Front (LLF) with alliance of seventeen like-minded left-wing parties. The purpose of LLF was to fight against growing religious fundamentalism and terrorism in the country.

Haqooq-e-Khalq Movement

As member of the People’s Solidarity Forum, Jan launched Haqooq-e-Khalq Movement (HKM) on May 19, 2018 in Lahore to open up new possibilities for social and political imagination. He is president of HKM. He also helped in formation of Progressive Research Collective to organize a series of study circles.

HKM along with Progressive Students Collective, a student organization, formed in 2016, organized many events like Faiz Aman Mela, 2018, Shehri Tahafuzz March, 2019 to demand justice for Sahiwal killings, protests against mob lynching and human rights violation, Labour Relief Campaign, Climate Justice March, theatre and seminars, Students Solidarity March of 2018, 2019, 2020 and 2021.
In March 2022, HKM announced that it would register as a political party and would contest the local and national elections.

Youth organiser

Jan was nominated in FIRs for organizing Students Solidarity March 2019 along with Iqbal Lala (father of Mashal Khan Shaheed) and Alamgir Wazir (cousin of Ali Wazir who is member national assembly).

In 2020, police again tried to arrest Jan for organizing the students solidarity march.

Articles
Jan has published and continues to publish regular articles on progressive politics in newspapers like The News International, Al Jazeera, The Friday Times, Herald (Pakistan)
and few others.
He is author of the book ‘Rule by Fear: Eight Theses on Authoritarianism in Pakistan’, Folio Books (November 2021).

Citations/Sources

References

Living people
Pakistani Marxists
1986 births